Primary Colors is a 1998 American comedy-drama film directed by Mike Nichols. The screenplay by Elaine May was adapted from the novel Primary Colors: A Novel of Politics, a roman à clef about Bill Clinton's first presidential campaign in 1992, which was originally published anonymously, but in 1996 was revealed to have been written by journalist Joe Klein, who had been covering Clinton's campaign for Newsweek. The film starred John Travolta, Emma Thompson, Billy Bob Thornton, Kathy Bates, Maura Tierney, Larry Hagman, and Adrian Lester.

It was critically acclaimed but a box office bomb, earning $52 million from a $65 million budget. Bates was nominated for an Academy Award for Best Supporting Actress for her performance, and May was nominated for an Academy Award for Best Adapted Screenplay.

Plot
Henry Burton, a young political idealist and grandson of a civil rights leader, is recruited to join the campaign of Jack Stanton, a charismatic Southern governor trying to win the Democratic Party nomination for President of the United States.

Henry is impressed by Jack's genuine warmth and empathy. He joins the governor's inner circle of political advisers: Jack's formidable wife, Susan Stanton; unconventional political strategist, Richard Jemmons; intelligent and attractive spokeswoman, Daisy Green; and sly political operator, Howard Ferguson, as they journey to New Hampshire, the first state to hold a presidential primary.

After Jack completes an impressive debate performance against his rivals, Henry's ex-girlfriend shows up to question the governor about his arrest for an anti-war protest at the 1968 Democratic Convention in Chicago. Jack called a U.S. senator to help him get released, then persuaded the mayor of Chicago to have his police record expunged. The team becomes worried that Jack's past indiscretions may be used against him by the press and his opponents.

Hiring the Stantons' old friend, tough but unbalanced Libby Holden, she investigates allegations, including Jack's notorious womanizing, that could be used by opponents to undermine him. One of these women, also Susan's hairdresser, Cashmere McLeod, produces secret taped conversations between the governor and her, showing they had an affair. Henry discovers the tapes have been doctored, so Libby tracks down the man responsible, forcing him at gunpoint to confess his guilt in a letter to the American public.

The campaign is then rocked by a fresh allegation when Jack's old friend, "Fat Willie" McCollister approaches Henry to tell him that his 17-year-old daughter Loretta, who worked for the Stantons as a babysitter, is pregnant and that Jack is the father. Henry and Howard tell Willie he must allow his daughter to undergo an amniocentesis to determine paternity. Although they convince Willie to remain silent, Henry is sickened.

Realizing Jack is falling behind in the polls, his team adopt an offensive strategy, attacking his nearest rival, Senator Harris, for casting anti-Israel votes and favoring cuts in Social Security and Medicare. Harris confronts Jack during a radio talk show in Florida but suffers two heart attacks during the encounter. This medical setback causes his withdrawal from the race. He is replaced by his friend, former Florida governor Fred Picker. His wholesome, straight-talking image is an immediate threat to Stanton's campaign.

Jack and Susan send Henry and Libby on an opposition research mission into Picker's past. They discover he had a cocaine addiction as governor, which led to the disintegration of his first marriage. They also meet with Picker's cocaine supplier, whom Picker had a homosexual affair with.

Not expecting the information to ever be used, Libby and Henry share the findings with Jack and Susan, but are dismayed when they decide to leak them to the press. Libby says, if Jack does so, she will reveal he tampered with the paternity test results which showed that he had slept with Willie's daughter. Libby commits suicide when realizing she spent her life idealizing Jack and Susan only to learn how flawed they truly are.

Racked with guilt over Libby's death, Jack and Henry take the incriminating information to Picker, and apologize for seeking it out. Picker admits to his past indiscretions, deciding to withdraw from the race and endorse Jack. Henry intends to quit the campaign, as he has become deeply disillusioned with the political process. Jack begs Henry to reconsider, saying they can make history.

Months later, President Jack Stanton is dancing at the Inaugural Ball with First Lady, Susan. He shakes the hands of his campaign staff, the last of whom is Henry.

Cast

Production
Following the publication of the book in 1996, director Mike Nichols paid more than $1 million for the screen rights. The film was scripted by writer and director Elaine May, who had collaborated with Nichols in a comedy double-act in the 1950s and 60s. Tom Hanks expressed interest in the project but was busy working on Saving Private Ryan and executive-producing From the Earth to the Moon for HBO, so recommended Nichols go ahead and cast someone else.
At the Cannes Festival, Thompson said she did not base her performance on Hillary Clinton, while Travolta said he based his on several presidents, but mostly on Bill Clinton.

Nichols was criticized for cutting an interracial love scene between Henry and Susan Stanton from the final version of the film. He responded that he had removed the scene because of unfavorable reactions from a preview audience. The film also generated controversy for its depiction of a Clinton-like character as it was also released close to the Lewinsky scandal.

Reception
The film received a positive reception from critics. Variety's reviewer called it a "film à clef" and said that the American public was likely to accept it as a factual account because it so closely mirrored real life characters and events. The Los Angeles Times gave high marks to the movie, noting Travolta's close mirroring of Bill Clinton, but describing Thompson's character as actually not based on Hillary Clinton. Entertainment Weekly called Travolta "Clintonian". The Cincinnati Enquirer gave accolades to the character portrayals of Bill and Hillary Clinton. Syndicated reviewer Roger Ebert said that the film was "insightful and very wise about the realities of political life" and The Cincinnati Enquirer said the film was a "nuanced dissection of how real American politics work".

In a negative review, Jeff Vice of the Deseret News wrote that the last half of the film dragged, Travolta's performance seemed more like an impersonation than actual acting, the film lacked subtlety or depth, and it was loaded with cheap and obvious jokes. Nevertheless, Vice wrote that "solid support is provided by Maura Tierney, Larry Hagman, and Stacy Edwards".

On Rotten Tomatoes the film has an approval rating of 81% based on 79 reviews, with an average rating of 7.30/10. The site's critics' consensus reads: "Well acted and surprisingly funny." On Metacritic it has a score of 70% based on reviews from 30 critics, indicating "generally favorable reviews". Audiences surveyed by CinemaScore gave the film a grade "B" on scale of A to F.

Box office
The film earned a disappointing box office gross, only taking $39 million domestically and $13 million in foreign markets, for a worldwide total gross of $52 million against a budget of $65 million.

Accolades

Home video
Primary Colors was released on VHS and DVD in September 1998. It was released on Blu-ray in October 2019. Blu-ray.com gave the transfer a negative review, calling it "a digitally processed mess. Grain is frozen in place, edge enhancement is obvious, clarity struggles, and details are sloppy and indistinct."

Soundtrack
The soundtrack album, featuring music by and produced by Ry Cooder, was released in March 1998.

Notes

References

Further reading

External links

 
 
 

1998 films
1990s political comedy-drama films
1990s satirical films
American political comedy-drama films
American satirical films
American political satire films
BAFTA winners (films)
Cultural depictions of American people
Films scored by Ry Cooder
Films about elections
Films based on American novels
Films about Bill Clinton
Films about presidents of the United States
Cultural depictions of Bill Clinton
Cultural depictions of Hillary Clinton
Films with screenplays by Elaine May
Films directed by Mike Nichols
Films set in Washington, D.C.
Films shot in New Orleans
Mutual Film Company films
Universal Pictures films
Films whose writer won the Best Adapted Screenplay BAFTA Award
Films à clef
1990s English-language films
1990s American films